Vaughan Robinson Nash  (1861 – 16 December 1932) was a British journalist,  economist and the husband of Rosalind Nash. He was a correspondent of Florence Nightingale, his wife's aunt. Nash served as the Principal Private Secretary in the Coalition Ministry of H. H. Asquith.

Biography 
Nash was born in Clifton, Bristol to Charles Nash, a timber merchant, and Sarah Ann. He began his career as journalist covering the London Dock Strike of 1889. He later became a "special correspondent", covering issues in crisis hit foreign countries, in particular drawing attention to the problem of hunger within the territories of the British empire, an issue that was sometimes neglected by administrators and politicians.

He was appointed Companion of the Order of the Bath (CB) in the 1909 Birthday Honours and Commander of the Royal Victorian Order  (CVO) in the 1911 Coronation Honours.
 
He had two sons and died in Woodgreen near Salisbury, aged 71.

Publications
 'The Great Famine and its Causes' by Vaughan Nash, The Economic Journal, Vol. 11, No. 44 (Dec., 1901), pp. 537–541.

References

External links

1861 births
1932 deaths
People from Clifton, Bristol
British economists
Companions of the Order of the Bath
Commanders of the Royal Victorian Order
Principal Private Secretaries to the Prime Minister